Bernd Düker (born 1 April 1992) is a German footballer who plays as a goalkeeper for German lower league side SC Spelle-Venhaus.

External links
 
 

1992 births
Living people
People from Gronau, North Rhine-Westphalia
Sportspeople from Münster (region)
Association football goalkeepers
German footballers
SV Werder Bremen II players
3. Liga players
Footballers from North Rhine-Westphalia